Taoroa Junction or Taoroa is a rural community in the Rangitikei District and Manawatū-Whanganui region of New Zealand's North Island.

In July 2017, homes in the area were snowed in and many homes were left without power by a major snowstorm.

Education

References

Rangitikei District
Populated places in Manawatū-Whanganui
Populated places on the Rangitīkei River